Jake Smollett (born July 29, 1989) is an American actor and cooking personality.

Early life and career

Smollett was born in New York City to a family of actors, the son of Janet ( Harris) and Joel Smollett. His father was Ashkenazi Jewish (his family immigrated from Russia and Poland), and his mother is African-American. Smollett began his career as a diaper model. His first role in a scripted series was in Hangin' with Mr. Cooper. He then starred alongside his five brothers and sisters in the ABC sitcom, On Our Own. Smollett also starred alongside his sister Jurnee Smollett as Samuel L. Jackson's son in the critically acclaimed feature film Eve's Bayou, directed by Kasi Lemmons. He was in ABC Family's The Middleman. Jake portrayed Noser, a character derived from Javier Grillo-Marxuach's comic book. The entire cast of The Middleman sat on the panel for Comic-Con in July 2009.

In 2016 Smollett joined his five siblings—brothers Jojo Smollett, Jussie Smollett, Jocqui Smollett and sisters Jazz Smollett and Jurnee Smollett—on Food Network to cook family-style meals every Saturday on Smollett Eats. He has also recently appeared guest judging on Food Network's hit show Chopped Junior. In 2017 Jake joined Rachael Ray on The Rachael Ray Show all season long for cooking segments.

Acting roles
 Hangin' with Mr. Cooper (1992), Jake (himself)
 On Our Own (1994–1995), Joc Jerrico
 A Guy Named Max (1996) Clarence Whitmoore
 Eve's Bayou (1997), Poe Batiste
 The Middleman (2008–2009), Noser
 Pitch This (2009), Luke
 Living by Design with Jake and Jazz (2019), Jake (himself)

References

External links
 
 

1989 births
Living people
Male actors from New York City
African-American male actors
American male child actors
American male film actors
American male television actors
American people of Polish-Jewish descent
American people of Russian-Jewish descent
American people of Romanian-Jewish descent
African-American Jews
Jewish American male actors
21st-century African-American people
21st-century American Jews
20th-century African-American people